is a Japanese director, animator, and storyboard artist. Oishi began his career at Studio Junio as an animator, but gained fame for his work with fellow directors Akiyuki Shinbo and Shin Oonuma at studio Shaft, where he directed the Bakemonogatari television series and its prequel film trilogy Kizumonogatari.

Career
Oishi began working for sub-contracting company Studio Junio in 1991, where he mostly acted as an in-between animator and key animator. Within at least two years, however, he moved to Gainax, where he mainly worked as a sub-contractor for studios like Sunrise. Starting in 1996, he mostly did sub-contracting animation work with Shaft and Toei Animation. In 2002, he did his first episode director and storyboard jobs on Cyborg 009: The Cyborg Soldier. 

In 2004, Oishi, Shin Oonuma, and Akiyuki Shinbo became known as "Team Shinbo" for their work with Shaft after Shinbo had invited the two to the company. "Team Shinbo" defined the unique visual artistry and storytelling methods that the studio became known for. He debuted as a series director with Nisio Isin's Bakemonogatari in 2009, which he co-directed with Shinbo. Oishi joined the project on request by Shinbo, who believed that Oishi's style of colors and inserts of lettering/Kanji would be stylistically beneficial to the series. Oishi joined the production somewhat late, and described that by the time he was on board, the first 5 episodes had their storyboard orders already completed. Upon its release, the series was immediately met with cult fame, and has been described as the series that pushed Shaft "into fame." 

With the success of Bakemonogatari, it was announced that the succeeding novel in Isin's Monogatari series, Kizumonogatari, would be adapted by the studio, and that Oishi and Shinbo would return to direct., and it was announced in 2011 to be a film. Production of the film suffered, however, as four years passed without any updates on the progress of its completion, and it wasn't until 2015 that it was announced that the film would instead be a film trilogy released in 2016 and 2017. Reactions to the films were very positive, with Nick Creamer stating that the first film was "a breathtaking experience", and he called the second film a "one of a kind."

Kizumonogatari chief animation directors Hideyuki Morioka and Hiroki Yamamura, and unit directors Toshimasa Suzuki and Yukihiro Miyamoto, all commented on Oishi's ability to create unique and thoroughly drawn-out storyboards, which Suzuki commented on the particular aspect of Oishi's sense of pacing and its contrast between Kizumonogatari and the earlier Bakemonogatari.

Style
Under Shinbo, Oishi's style takes derivatives of Shinbo's style as his own, such as Shinbo's usage of faceless "mob" (background) characters. Shinbo made these mob characters faceless, or simply wouldn't include them at all, but Oishi added floral patterns, his name, and other Kanji text on top of those faceless characters, which Shinbo commented was "surprisingly interesting." With the switch from analog to digital in the early-to-mid 2000s, Shinbo noted that Oishi's talent was able to blossom due to the freedoms in creating and switching colors in digital environments. While working on Pani Poni Dash, Oishi attempted to experiment with references to other media, and in one of his episodes tried referencing a drawing of Bakanon's father from Tensai Bakabon by Fujio Akatsuka. However, he was scolded for its inclusion by producers and was told that it might be painted over; though, Oishi instead suggested changing the drawings to flowers, which eventually stuck. Oishi said that he grew up on the works of Osamu Tezuka, which sometimes referenced or outright borrowed drawings from other works, and questioned why Tezuka's works were allowed, but he was not allowed do the same. While Pani Poni Dash series director Shin Oonuma was working in tandem with the rest of the staff on creating references, parodies, and better works, Oishi commented that he worked more alone and away from the Oonuma team. Rather than put in things that other people were suggesting like the Oonuma team, Oishi appealed more to self-indulgence in putting only what he liked into his episodes, such as references to GeGeGe no Kitarō. Oishi experimented with high-saturating colors and 3DCG background environments as well as the interactions between 2D-animated characters and 3D models. Similar to Shinbo's desire to make "good pictures" in his works, Oishi places a particular emphasis on making images that he believes are the best that he can make.

Oishi has also become particularly well-known for his use of on-screen text, a style that Oishi overall contributed to the house "Shaft style" originating in the Pani Poni Dash openings. In the midst of episodes themselves, however, the initial appearance of on-screen text as it appears in Shaft series aside from episodes or series directed by Oishi comes from Hidamari Sketch episode 2, in which he used Kanji to punctuate or emphasize lines of dialogue for comedic purposes, for puns, and so forth. Later, Shinbo asked Oishi to be the series director for Bakemonogatari with the intent of visualizing words themselves, which Oishi had proven himself to be good at doing. However, as Oishi experimented more with on-screen text, and its usage was incorporated by the other Shaft directors, so too did its incorporation by Oishi himself.

Works

Television series
 Highlights roles with series directorial duties. Highlights roles with assistant director or supervising duties.

OVAs

Films
 Highlights roles with film directorial duties.

Other
 Highlights roles with series directorial duties.

Awards and nominations

Notes

Works cited

References

External links

Japanese film directors
Japanese television directors
Anime directors
Living people
1970 births